The men's cycling team sprint at the 2016 Olympic Games in Rio de Janeiro took place on 11 August 2016.

The medals were presented by Camiel Eurlings, IOC member, Netherlands and José Manuel Pelaez, Member of the UCI Management Committee.

Competition format
A men's team sprint race consists of a three-lap race between two teams of three cyclists, starting on opposite sides of the track.  Each member of the team must lead for one of the laps.

The tournament consisted of an initial qualifying round.  The top eight teams advanced to the first round.  The first round comprised head-to-head races based on seeding (1st vs. 8th, 2nd vs. 7th, etc.). The winners of those four heats advanced to the medal round, with the two fastest winners competing in the gold medal final and the two slower winners facing off for bronze.

Schedule
All times are Brasília Time (UTC−03:00)

Results

Qualification
The fastest 8 teams qualify for the first round.

 South Korea were relegated for breaching article 3.2.153
 Q = qualified

First round
First round heats are held as follows:
Heat 1: 4th v 5th qualifier
Heat 2: 3rd v 6th qualifier
Heat 3: 2nd v 7th qualifier
Heat 4: 1st v 8th qualifier

The heat winners are ranked on time, from which the top 2 proceed to the gold medal final and the other 2 proceed to the bronze medal final.

 QG = qualified for gold medal final
 QB = qualified for bronze medal final

Finals
The final classification is determined in the medal finals.

References

team sprint
Cycling at the Summer Olympics – Men's team sprint
Men's events at the 2016 Summer Olympics